Tullus may refer to

 Tullus (praenomen), an ancient Roman praenomen
 Tullus Hostilius, legendary king of Rome
 Tullus (comics), a comic book character